Seyyed Mohammad Ali Keshavarz Sadr  (Mahallat, 1902 – 17 October 1974) was a lawyer, judge, author and leading figure in the National Front of Iran. A close friend and associate of Prime Minister Mohammad Mosaddegh, often acting as his official deputy, he nationalised the Iranian fishing industry and played a major role in the nationalization of the Iranian oil industry. He served as governor of Isfahan, Gilan and Tehran. He entered parliament as representative of Khorramabad. After resisting the 1953 Iranian coup d'état  which toppled the democratically elected government of Mossadegh, Keshavarz Sadr was imprisoned and tortured. After his release he became spokesperson of the Second National Front and authored a range of books.

Early life 

Keshavarz Sadr was born into a landowning, aristocratic family. His father Seyyed Hossein Khan (Mirza Kouchek Khan) ‘Bahador ol-Molk’ was a landowner from Khomeyn, who owned several villages and estates around Mahallat and who served as a military commander in the constitutionalist army. His father was a stepbrother of Prime Minister Mohsen Sadr (Sadr ol-Ashraf II). His mother Mariam Keshavarz was his father's cousin. The couple also had another son named Ali Mohammad Keshavarz Sadr. From the marriage of his father with Haj Malek(eh) Khanoum Khajeh Nassiri (a cousin of Mohsen Sadr), Keshavarz Sadr had two half-sisters: Eghlim Sadat and Shazdeh Aqa Keshavarz (Sadr).

Keshavarz Sadr earned a degree from the Graduate School of Law in Tehran and proceeded to work as a lawyer at the Justice Department. He was appointed as the Director General Inspector of the Ministry of Justice and would rise to become the Head of the Judiciary in 1946.

First National Front 

He was a founding member of the National Front of Iran. He was first elected into the 15th and 16th Iranian Majlis as representative of Khorramabad and subsequently served as governor of Gilan, where his main concern was the implementation of the nationalisation of fisheries. At the end of January 1953, the Soviet request for an extension of their expired concession was turned down. In a meeting between Keshavarz Sadr and a USSR envoy on a ship in the Caspian Sea, the Iranian fishing industries were officially nationalised.

He became the governor of Isfahan (a key province for Mossadegh), one of his recent predecessors being Mohammad Sa'ed. Keshavarz Sadr was one of ‘the eleven men’ who proposed the bill of oil nationalisation to the Iranian Majlis. He resisted the coup d'état in August 1953 until his residency collapsed following a military attack. He was viciously beaten and locked up in solitary confinement for 8 months.

Second National Front 

Mossadegh, whilst under house arrest, chose Keshavarz Sadr as his personal lawyer, which made him one of few legally allowed to visit the former Prime Minister. In 1960 Keshavarz Sadr, with the assistance of other prominent nationalists, formed the Second National Front, of which he would be main spokesman until 1963. Mohammad Reza Pahlavi could not but recognise the movement due to pressure from the international community. 
 
On January 30, 1961, the headquarters of the National Front was closed down by the police. The National Front leadership decided to attract attention with a sit-in in the Senate building. The delegation included, amongst others, Keshavarz Sadr himself, Mehdi Bazargan and Kazem Hassibi. Keshavarz Sadr, who also dealt with NF student affairs, would be routinely arrested and interrogated by Savak until his death.

He died in 1974 following a heart attack. The Pahlavi regime prevented his funeral from taking place, presumably to avert the large gathering of National Front supporters.

Literary Activities 
Keshavarz Sadr published a series of well-received articles dealing with constitutional law and Iranian legal procedures. He also researched the ancient literature and history of Iran. However, his most important works are literary commentaries. He wrote a book that exclusively deals with female poets (Az Räbe'eh ta Parvin).

Private life
His brother Ali Mohammad Keshavarz Sadr would become an architect and married to Badri Sadat Pasandideh, daughter of Ayatollah Morteza Pasandideh, the older brother of Ayatollah Ruhollah Khomeini.

His sister Khanoum Eghlim Sadat Keshavarz (Sadr) (1922-2018) married post- and telegraph director, judge, poet, diarist and historian Amir Houshang Khan Khosrovani, whose poetic soirees were attended by Mohammad-Hossein Shahriar and others.

His son Dr. Amir Houshang Keshavarz Sadr was a scholar of Iranian history and society.

Legacy 
Mossadegh's grandson held particular praise for Mohammad Ali Keshavarz Sadr and Tehran Mayor Nosratollah Amini, saying of the former that he was “on his own standing, a well-known and respected statesman (…) these men would use their integrity, their clout, their prestige and age to do positive things.”

References

National Front (Iran) MPs
1902 births
1974 deaths
Iranian governors
20th-century Iranian judges
Members of the 15th Iranian Majlis
Members of the 16th Iranian Majlis